The Hodoș is a left tributary of the river Târnava Mare in Romania. It discharges into the Târnava Mare in Oțeni.

References

Rivers of Romania
Rivers of Harghita County